Talkheh Dan (also Romanized as Talkheh Dān; also known as Talkhehdān-e Soflá) is a village in Sar Asiab-e Yusefi Rural District, Bahmai-ye Garmsiri District, Bahmai County, Kohgiluyeh and Boyer-Ahmad Province, Iran. At the 2006 census, its population was 114, in 23 families.

References 

Populated places in Bahmai County